Ó Maoilmhichíl is an uncommon surname of Irish origin devolving into the common Irish surnames Mitchell and Mulvihill.

The surname Mitchell is derived from the sept or clan name Uí Mhaoilmhichíl which means patrons or devotees of Saint Michael the Archangel.

As the English language began to replace Irish and Scottish Gaelic, the surname was anglicised as Mitchell, Michael, Mulvihill, Mulville, or Melville, and other variations. 

A family motto Pro aris et focis originates from the Irish family name "Mulvihill".

See also
 County Sligo
 List of Sligo people
 Mitchell (surname)
 Mulvihill
 Sligo

References

Descendants of the surname Ó Maoilmhichil
Brother Walfrid (born Andrew Kearns), Marist Brothers
John Francis Mitchell, Vice Chairman, Motorola, Inventor of Cell Phone
Daráine Mulvihill/Ní Mhaolmhichil, Irish Person of the Year 2001
William Mulvihill, Author

External links
 Mitchells From Sligo Clan Link
 Mulvihill Clan Link

People from County Sligo
Surnames